The Brute is a 1927 American silent Western film directed by Irving Cummings and starring Monte Blue. It was produced and distributed by Warner Brothers. It is considered to be a lost film.

Cast
 Monte Blue as Easy Going Martin Sondes
 Leila Hyams as Jennifer Duan
 Clyde Cook as Oklahoma Red
 Carroll Nye as The El
 Paul Nicholson as Square Deal Felton

See also
 List of early Warner Bros. sound and talking features

References

External links
 The Brute on IMDB
 

1927 films
1927 Western (genre) films
1927 lost films
American black-and-white films
Films directed by Irving Cummings
Lost American films
Lost Western (genre) films
Silent American Western (genre) films
Warner Bros. films
1920s American films
1920s English-language films